On 28 August 1993 a non-scheduled domestic passenger flight operated by Tajikistan Airlines and served by a Yakovlev Yak-40 crashed during takeoff at Khorog Airport, killing 82 people on board (including 14 children). Militants during the civil war in Tajikistan forced the crew to take more passengers than the aircraft was able to carry, which led to an excess takeoff weight. Unable to take off, the aircraft overran the runway at high speed, struck several obstacles and fell into the Panj River.

The crash remains the deadliest accident involving a Yakovlev Yak-40 and the deadliest aviation accident in Tajikistan.

Crash
During boarding at the Tajik city of Khorugh the militants, controlling the adjacent area during the civil war, threatened the crew with weapons and forced it to take 81 passengers, while the aircraft was designed to carry only 28. This led the maximum takeoff weight to be exceeded by 3,000 kg.

The crew was forced to take off under the threat of shooting. The left main landing gear struck a low earth embankment, 148 or 150 m beyond the runway end. Then the aircraft struck a boulder 60 cm high. Subsequently, the right gear struck a concrete pillbox 60 m further. The aircraft ultimately fell into the Panj River and disintegrated. Four passengers survived.

References

1993 in Tajikistan
Accidents and incidents involving the Yakovlev Yak-40
Aviation accidents and incidents in 1993
Aviation accidents and incidents in Tajikistan
Tajik Air Yakovlev Yak-40 incident
August 1993 events in Asia
1993 disasters in Tajikistan